Paul French may refer to:

 Paul French (priest) (died 1600), Canon of Windsor
Isaac Asimov (1920–1992), who used this pseudonym for the Lucky Starr juvenile books
 Paul Comly French (1903–1960), American reporter, writer, anti-war activist and non-profit executive
 Paul French (author) (born 1966), British writer